The Stable (formerly known as Stable on the Strand) is an annual nativity play in Townsville, Queensland, Australia. It has been described as "part installation, part fun fair and part theatrical performance".

The play is staged from 18 to 22 December on The Strand in Townsville.  The festivities also include a mock Bethlehem with actors playing soldier, shepherds and the Holy Family The event attracts up to 40,000 visitors a year.

History

1999 
The Stable was created in the Mount Louisa youth center in 1999 by Jay Goodwin and  Anne Harley, and was attended by 120 people on the opening night.

2002 
The Stable moved to the Strand and acquired the name 'The Stable on the Strand'. The original baby Jesus was played by Lachlan Crossan.

2020 
During the Covid-19 pandemic, Stable on the Stand changed to incorporate 'stations' around Townsville that people would drive past.  This was also helped by the creation of the event-specific Star Chase app, which showcased the locations of the Stable on the Strand 'station' displays and local light displays for people to create their own driving tours of the attractions.

2021 
Stable on the Strand relocated to Riverway to explore the opportunity a different location provides when reaching their audience.

2022 
The Stable on the Strand changed their name to The Stable.  The Stable in 2022 - bringing a gift of love to the people of Townsville this Christmas through an exciting hybrid event.  We are going to light up the city with Stable on the Streets displays by inviting the community to again create and register their Christmas displays.  In December, an interactive map will come alive and allow people to drive around and see the visual displays depicting the message of Christmas.  Come and join us at Stable at Riverway from the 18th -22nd December, as we immerse ourselves in the story of Christmas with live actors, realistic scenes, costumes, animals and activities for the whole family to enjoy.  There will also be heaps of entertainment, a wide selection of food and a designated youth area.

This is a great event for the whole family to come to this Christmas.  A free bus will run along Riverway Drive to pick up families from within the area.

The story
The play is an interactive re-creation of the traditional Christmas story, and it involves up to 1,000 volunteers per year. In 2002, it was awarded the honour of Townsville's Event of the Year.

Features

The Stable Village - vendors and actors in costume
Hospitality Areas - food and beverages
Stable on the Streets - Christmas lights displays around Townsville
Stable at Riverway - The story of Christmas with live actors, realistic scenes, costumes, animals and activities.

References

External links
 Townsville City Council
 Stable On The Strand

Tourist attractions in Queensland
Townsville
Events in Queensland
Recurring events established in 1999
1999 establishments in Australia
Christmas events and celebrations